This is an index of Catholic Church articles. Portals and navigation boxes are at the bottom of the page. For a listing of Catholic Church articles by category, see :Category:Catholic Church (and its various subcategories and pages) at the bottom of the page.

Principal articles are:
Catholic Church
Glossary of the Catholic Church
Outline of the Catholic Church
Timeline of the Catholic Church
Index of Vatican City-related articles

For various other lists, see "L" (below).

A
Abbacy, Territorial
Abbey
Abbey, Territorial
Abbess
Abbot
Abbot nullius
Abbot primate
Abortion
Ad limina visits
Africa, Catholic Church in (various articles)
African pope
Altarage
American Cardinals Dinner
Annulment
Apostolic administrator
Apostolic life, Society of
Apostolic nuncio
Apostolic Penitentiary
Apostolic prefect
Apostolic Signatura, The Supreme Tribunal of the
Apostolic succession
Apostolic vicar
Appointment of Catholic bishops
Archbishop
Archdiocese
Archiepiscopal See, Major
Archiepiscopal Church, Major
Asia, Catholic Church in (various articles)
Assumptionist
Augustinian Order
Auxiliary bishop

B
The Bad Popes
Baptism, Sacrament of
Baptism of Jesus
Beatification
Benedict IX, Pope
Benedict XII, Pope
Benedict XIV, Pope
Benedict XV, Pope
Benedict XVI, Pope Emeritus
Benedict XVI, Resignation of Pope
Benedict XVI, Theology of Pope
Benedictine
Bible
Birth control
Bishops, Appointment of Catholic
Bishop (Catholic Church)
Bishop emeritus
Blessed Virgin Mary
Brother (Catholic)
Bull
Bullarium

C
Canon law (Catholic Church)
Canon law, History of
Capuchin Order
Cardinal (Catholicism)
Carmelites
Carthusians
Catechesis
Catechism of the Catholic Church
Catechumen
Cathedra
Cathedral
Catholic Answers
Catholic Bible
Catholic Catechist
Catholic Church (disambiguation)
Catholic Church (various articles on history, hierarchy, theology, sacraments, Mariology, Doctors of the Church, Pope Benedict XVI, papal documents, Eastern Catholic Churches, Eastern rites, liturgical traditions) (see "Catholic Church" navigation box (below))
Catholic Church and abortion
Catholic Church and AIDS
Catholic Church and capital punishment
Catholic Church and colonialism
Catholic Church and ecumenism
Catholic Church and evolution
Catholic Church and health care
Catholic Church and HIV/AIDS
Catholic Church and Nazi Germany
Catholic Church and politics in the United States
Catholic Church and science
Catholic Church and slavery
Catholic Church and the United Nations
Catholic Church and women
Catholic Church by country
Catholic Church, Definition of the
Catholic Church doctrine on the ordination of women
Catholic Church hierarchy
Catholic Church hierarchy (various articles) (see "Catholic Church" navigation box (below))
Catholic Directory
Catholic guilt
Catholic King
Catholic League (U.S.)
Catholic liturgy
Catholic Monarch
Catholic Probabilism
Catholic religious order
Catholic religious orders, articles on various (see corresponding navigation box (below))
Catholic Renewal
Catholic school
Catholic spirituality
Catholic theology, History of (various articles) (see "History of Catholic theology" navigation box (below))
Catholic theology of the body
Catholicism
Chancellor
Christian Opposition to Anti-Semitism
Chronology of Jesus*Coadjutor bishop
Code of Canon Law (1983)
Code of Canons of the Eastern Churches
College of Cardinals
Columbian Squires
Communion and Liberation
Concelebration
Confirmation, Sacrament of
Religious congregation
Congregation (Roman Curia)
Congregation for Bishops
Congregation for Catholic Education
Congregation for Divine Worship and the Discipline of the Sacraments
Congregation for Institutes of Consecrated Life and Societies of Apostolic Life
Congregation for the Causes of Saints
Congregation for the Clergy
Congregation for the Doctrine of the Faith
Congregation for the Evangelization of Peoples
Congregation for the Oriental Churches
Consecrated life
Consecrated life (Catholic Church)
Consecrated life, Institute of
Consecration
Consultor
Contraception
Converts to Catholicism, List of
Criticism of the Catholic Church
Crozier
Crucifix
Cultural Catholic
Curia, Moderator of the
Curia (Roman Catholic Church)
Curia, Roman

D
The Da Vinci Code
Deacon
Decree
Definitor
Devil
Dicastery
Diocesan administrator
Diocesan bishop
Diocesan chancery
Diocesan priest
Diocese
Diocese of Rome
Dioceses by country (various articles)
Divine Mercy Sunday
Doctor of the Church
Doctrine on the ordination of women, Catholic Church
Dominican Order

E
Easter
Eastern Catholic Churches
Eastern Catholic Churches and Eastern rites (various articles) (see "Catholic Church" navigation box (below))
Eastern Catholic liturgy
Ecclesiastical province
Ecclesiastical provinces in the United States, List of (category)
Ecclesiastical ring
Economy of Salvation
Ecumenical council
Encyclical
Eparch
Episcopal conference
Episcopal succession
Eternal Word Television Network (EWTN)
Eucharist, Sacrament of
Eucharistic Congress
Europe, Catholic Church in (various articles)
Exarch
Excommunicated by the Catholic Church, List of people
Excommunication
Extraordinary minister of Holy Communion

F
Faithful Majesty
Father Millet Cross
Fellowship of Catholic University Students (FOCUS)
First Communion
Foreign relations of the Holy See
Former Roman Catholic dioceses
Formulary controversy
Franciscan
Franciscan Friars of the Renewal

G
Gaudium et spes
General Roman Calendar
Global organisation of the Catholic Church
Glossary of the Catholic Church
God
Gregorian chant

H
Heaven
Hell
Historical list of the Catholic bishops of the United States
History of Catholic theology (various articles) (see "History of Catholic theology" navigation box (below))
History of Christianity
History of Roman Catholicism in the United States
History of the Catholic Church
History of the Catholic Church since 1962
History of the Catholic Church (various articles) (see "History of the Catholic Church" navigation box (below))
History of the Papacy
Holy Cross, Congregation of
Holy Matrimony, Sacrament of
Holy Orders (Catholic Church)
Holy See
Holy See and the United Nations

I
Incense, Religious use of
Index of Vatican City-related articles
Indult
Indult of exclaustration
Institute of consecrated life
Institute, Religious
Institute, Secular

J
Jesuits
Jesus
John XXIII, Pope
John Paul I, Pope
John Paul II, Pope
Judaism, Pope John Paul II and
Judaism, Relations between Catholicism and

K
Knights of Columbus
Knights of Columbus Building (New Haven, Connecticut)
Knights of Columbus, Supreme Knight of the
Knights of the Holy Sepulchre

L
Laity
Lapsed Catholic
Latin Church
Latin liturgical rites
Law, Canon
Lay Ecclesial Ministry
Lay communion
Legends surrounding the papacy
Lednica 2000
Life of Jesus in the New Testament
Life Teen
Limbo
List of Catholic bishops of the United States
List of Catholic dioceses in Canada
List of Catholic priests
List of Catholic religious institutes
List of Catholic rites and churches
List of Catholic saints
List of current patriarchs (including Catholic)
List of diplomatic missions of the Holy See
List of Eastern Catholic seminaries
List of former Roman Catholics
List of Knights of Columbus
List of living cardinals (sortable by name, country, and birthdate)
List of names of popes
List of papal elections
List of popes
List of Roman Catholic archdioceses (by country and continent)
List of Roman Catholic dioceses (alphabetical) (including archdioceses)
List of Roman Catholic dioceses (structured view) (including archdioceses)
List of Roman Catholic dioceses in Oceania
List of Roman Catholic seminaries
List of sexually active popes
List of the Catholic bishops of the United States
List of the Catholic cathedrals of the United States
List of the Catholic dioceses of the United States
List of Catholic bishops of India
Lists of patriarchs (including Catholic)
Lists of patriarchs, archbishops, and bishops
Lists of Roman Catholics (category)
Liturgical traditions of the Catholic Church (various articles) (see "Catholic Church" navigation box (below))
Liturgies of the Catholic Church (various articles) (see "Sacraments, Rites, and Liturgies of the Catholic Church" navigation box (below))
Lumen gentium

M
Mariology
Mary, the Holy Mother of God
Mass (liturgy)
Mass (music)
Mass (Roman_Rite)
Mediatrix
Medieval Restorationism
Metropolitan bishop
Milagro (votive)
Military of Vatican City
Military ordinariate
Minister (Catholic_Church)
Ministry of Jesus
Miracles of Jesus
Mission sui juris
Mitre
Moderator of the Curia
Modernism (Roman Catholicism)
The Monastery (BBC TV series)
Monsignor
Mother of God Community

N
North America, Catholic Church in (various articles)
Nostra aetate
Nun
Nunciature, Apostolic
Nunciature of the Holy See in Washington, D.C.
Nuncio, Apostolic

O
Oceania, Catholic Church in (various articles)
Occult Compensation
Opus Dei
Oratory of Saint Philip Neri
Order, Catholic religious
Ordination of women, Catholic Church doctrine on the
L'Osservatore Romano
Outline of Catholicism

P
Papal conclave
Papal court
Papal deposing power
Papal documents (various articles) (see "Catholic Church" navigation box (below))
Papal states
Papal symbols and rituals (various articles) (see corresponding navigation box (below))
Parish (Catholic Church)
Pastor
Patriarch
Penance, Sacrament of
Permanent Observer of the Holy See to the United Nations (in New York City)
Permanent Observer of the Holy See to the United Nations in Geneva
Politics of the Vatican City
Pontiff
Pontifical academy
Pontifical Commission
Pontifical Council
Pontifical Council for the Laity
Pontifical North American College
Pope
Pope Benedict XVI (various articles on his pontificate) (see "Catholic Church" navigation box (below))
Pope Paul VI's reform of the Roman Curia
Popes of the Catholic Church, articles on various (see corresponding navigation box (below))
Prefect
Prelate
Priesthood (Catholic Church)
Priest shortage
Priests, List of Catholic
Primacy of the Roman Pontiff
Privilège du blanc
Pro-cathedral
Pro-life movement
Puerto Rican Episcopal Conference
Purgatory

Q
Quinquennial Visit Ad Limina

R
Religious (Catholicism)
Religious institute (Catholic)
Religious order
Religious order rites
Religious orders, articles on various Catholic (see "Catholic religious orders" navigation box (below))
Resurrection of Jesus
Right of Option
Rite of Christian Initiation of Adults (RCIA)
Rites of the Catholic Church (various articles) (see "Sacraments, Rites, and Liturgies of the Catholic Church" navigation box (below))
Rites, Religious order
Role of the Catholic Church in civilization
Roman Catholic (term)
Roman Catholic Church
Catholic Church by country (various articles)
Roman Catholic theology
Roman Catholicism in Africa
Roman Catholicism in Asia
Roman Catholicism in Europe
Roman Catholics by country
Roman Curia
Roman Curia, Pope Paul VI's reform of the
Roman Curia, Pope John Paul II's reform of the
Roman Rota, Tribunal of the
Roman Inquisition
Roman and Universal Inquisition, Supreme Sacred Congregation of the
Rosary and scapular
Royal veto of the appointment of bishops

S
Sacramentals
Sacraments of the Catholic Church
Sacraments of the Catholic Church (various articles) (see "Sacraments, Rites, and Liturgies of the Catholic Church" navigation box (below))
Saint
Second Lateran Council
Secretariat of State (Vatican)
Secular institute
Seminary
Separation of Church and State
Signatura, Supreme Tribunal of the Apostolic
Society of apostolic life
South America, Catholic Church in (various articles)
Squire Roses
St. Peter's Basilica
Stylites
Suffragan bishop
Suffragan diocese
Supererogation
Supreme Knight of the Knights of Columbus
Supreme Tribunal of the Apostolic Signatura
Swiss Guard

T
Ten Commandments, Catholic doctrine regarding the
Territorial prelate
Territories of Roman Catholic dioceses in India
The Catholic University of America
The Catholic University of America and The Knights of Columbus
Theology of the Catholic Church (various articles) (see "Catholic Church" navigation box (below))
Theology, History of Catholic (various articles) (see "History of Catholic theology" navigation box (below))
Timeline of the Roman Catholic Church
Titular bishop
Traditionalist Catholic
Trinity

U
United States Conference of Catholic Bishops
Universal call to holiness

V
Vatican I
Vatican II
Vatican and Eastern Europe (1846–1958)
Vatican Apostolic Library
Vatican Bank
Vatican Basilica
Vatican City, State of
Vatican City in World War II
Vatican City, Politics of the
Vatican City topics (various articles) (see corresponding navigation box (below))
Vatican Constitution
Vatican Diplomatic Corps
Vatican Film Library
Vatican flag
Vatican guard
Vatican Gardens
Vatican Historical Museum
Vatican Information Service
Vatican Library
Vatican Museums
Vatican newspapers
Vatican Observatory
Vatican Publishing House
Vatican Press Office
Vatican Radio
Vatican Secret Archives
Vatican Secretary of State
Vatican Television Center
Venerable people (Roman Catholic), List of
Vicar general
Vimpa
Visions of Jesus and Mary
Vocational Discernment in the Catholic Church

W
Women, Catholic Church doctrine on the ordination of
World Youth Day

X

Y
Youth Day, World

Z
Zucchetto

1
1917 Code of Canon Law
1983 Code of Canon Law

See also 
Index of Eastern Christianity–related articles (including articles about Eastern Catholic Churches)
Index of Vatican City–related articles
:Category:Anti-Catholicism

Catholic Church topics